John Antony Bossy FBA (30 April 1933 – 23 October 2015) was a British historian who was a professor of history at the University of York.

Career
Bossy was educated at Queens' College, Cambridge, where he was inspired by Walter Ullmann. He lived and lectured in London (1962–66) and Belfast (1966–78) and was a member of the Institute for Advanced Study at Princeton.

Bossy specialised in the history of religion, particularly in that of Christianity during the Reformation period and beyond. According to some commentators, his approach fused together elements of disciplines such as sociology and theology.

His Ph.D. thesis was written on the relations between French and English Catholics during the period of the Renaissance which contained within it the seeds of later work regarding Michel de Castelnau.

He frequently wrote for the London Review of Books and published series of articles in the journals Recusant History and Past & Present. In 1991 The Embassy Affair won the British Crime Writers' Association CWA Gold Dagger for Non-Fiction and (jointly) the Wolfson History Prize.

He moved to the University of York in 1979, where he was professor of History until his retirement in 2000. In 1993 he was elected a Fellow of the British Academy.

Works
 The English Catholic Community, 1570-1850 (1979)
 'The Mass as a Social Institution, 1200-1700' Past & Present, Vol. 100, Issue 1, 1 August (1983)
 Christianity in the West, 1400-1700 (1985)
 Peace in the Post-Reformation (1998) 
 Giordano Bruno and the Embassy Affair (1991; second edition 2002)
 Under the Molehill: An Elizabethan Spy Story (2001) 
 Disputes and Settlements: Law and Human Relations in the West (2003) – edited by Bossy

References

External links
 Open-access articles and book reviews by John Bossy from Past & Present. Accessed 12 Nov. 2015.
 Open-access articles by John Bossy from British Catholic History. Accessed 12 Nov. 2015.

Academics of the University of York
Alumni of Queens' College, Cambridge
British historians
Fellows of the British Academy
Institute for Advanced Study visiting scholars
1933 births
2015 deaths